Tui na is form of alternative medicine similar to shiatsu. As a branch of traditional Chinese medicine, it is often used in conjunction with acupuncture, moxibustion, fire cupping, Chinese herbalism, tai chi or other Chinese internal martial arts, and qigong.

Background 
Tui na is a hands-on body treatment that uses Chinese Daoist principles in an effort to bring the eight principles of traditional Chinese medicine into balance. The practitioner may brush, knead, roll, press, and rub the areas between each of the joints, known as the eight gates, to attempt to open the body's defensive chi (wei qi) and get the energy moving in the meridians and the muscles. Techniques may be gentle or quite firm. The name comes from two of the actions: tui means "to push" and na means "to lift and squeeze." Other strokes include shaking and tapotement. The practitioner can then use a range of motion, traction, and the stimulation of acupressure points. These techniques are claimed to aid in the treatment of both acute and chronic musculoskeletal conditions, as well as many non-musculoskeletal conditions. 

As with many other traditional Chinese medical practices, different schools vary in their approach to the discipline. In traditional Korean medicine it is known as china, and it is related also to Japanese massage or anma and its derivatives shiatsu and sekkotsu. In the West, tui na is taught as a part of the curriculum at some acupuncture schools.

Efficacy 
Most of the research on tui na originates from China, and is of poor quality and ethically questionable. There is no good evidence tui na is an effective treatment and its safety is poorly understood.

As one example of recent research from another source, a small study found with reasonable confidence, cost-effective reduction of neck pain through application of Tui na.

See also
 Chin na
 Dit Da
 Gua Sha
 Naprapathy
 Pushing hands
 Dim Mak
 Varma Kalai
 Acupressure

References 

Traditional Chinese medicine
Manual therapy
Chinese words and phrases
Massage therapy